Sarah Moon HonFRPS (born Marielle Warin; 1941) is a French photographer. Initially a model, she turned to fashion photography in the 1970s. Since 1985, she has concentrated on gallery and film work.

Biography
Marielle Warin was born in Vernon, France in 1941. Her Jewish family was forced to leave occupied France for England. As a teenager she studied drawing before working as a model in London and Paris (1960–1966) under the name Marielle Hadengue. She also became interested in photography, taking shots of her model colleagues. In 1970, she finally decided to spend all her time on photography rather than modelling, adopting Sarah Moon as her new name. She successfully captured the fashionable atmosphere of London after the "swinging sixties", working closely with Barbara Hulanicki, who had launched the popular clothes store Biba.

In 1972, she shot the Pirelli calendar, the first woman to do so. After working for a long time with Cacharel, her reputation grew and she also received commissions from Chanel, Dior, Comme des Garçons and Vogue. Since 1985, Moon has moved into gallery work and even started developing her own films including Circuss (2002) and Le Fil Rouge (2006). She later directed the music video for Khaled's pop hit Aïcha.

Publications
Improbable Memories. Matrix, 1981. .
Vrais Semblants = Real Appearances. Parco, 1991. .
Coïncidences. Santa Fe, NM: Arena, 2001. .
Sarah Moon 1,2,3,4,5. London: Thames & Hudson, 2008. .

Exhibitions

 1980: "Fashon" festival de photographie, Arles, France
 1983: Center of Photography, New York
 1993: Staley-Wise Gallery, New York
 2002: Haus der Photographie, Hamburg
 2003: Maison européenne de la photographie, Paris
 2004: Kyoto Museum of Contemporary Art, Japan
 2008: Cirkus, Leica Gallery, Prague
 2011: Théâtre de la Photographie et de l'Image Charles Nègre, Nice
 2012: The Black Hood, Multimedia Art Museum / Moscow House of Photography
 2013: Alchimies: Sarah Moon, Musée d’Histoire Naturelle, Paris 
 2015: Sarah Moon − Now and Then, Haus der photographie Deichtorhallen, Hamburg
 2016: Sarah Moon 1, 2, 3, 4, 5, Kahitsukan, Kyoto Modern Art Museum, Kyoto, Japan
 2020: Sarah Moon − PastPresent, Musée d’Art Moderne de Paris, Paris  
 2021: Sarah Moon − At the Still Point, Fotografiska, Stockholm, New York and Tallinn

Awards
 1985: International Center of Photography's Infinity Award for Applied Photography
 1995: Grand Prix national de la photographie, France
 2007: The Cultural Award from the German Society for Photography (DGPh), with Robert Delpire
 2008: Prix Nadar for (1 2 3 4 5, Delpire), Paris
 2018: Honorary Fellowship of the Royal Photographic Society, Bath
 2022: Induction into the International Photography Hall of Fame and Museum

References

Further reading

External links
 Sarah Moon's selected works from Art Days
 Sarah Moon overview from Michael Hoppen Gallery
 

French photographers
1941 births
French women photographers
Fashion photographers
People from Eure
Photographers from London
Living people